Playford is a single-member electoral district for the South Australian House of Assembly. Named after the long serving South Australian premier Tom Playford, it is a 22.7 km² suburban electorate in Adelaide's north, taking in the suburbs of Green Fields, Mawson Lakes, Para Hills, Para Hills West, Parafield and Parafield Gardens.

Playford was created as a safe Labor seat and was first contested at the 1970 election, where it was won by Labor candidate Terry McRae. At the 1989 election, McRae resigned from politics, with the seat won by Labor candidate John Quirke. Though typically a safe Labor seat, the seat technically became marginal, reduced to just a 2.7 percent two-party margin at the 1993 election landslide. At the 1997 election, Quirke resigned to enter the Australian Senate, with the seat won by Labor candidate Jack Snelling.

Members for Playford

Election results

Notes

References
 ECSA profile for Playford: 2018
 ABC profile for Playford: 2018
 Poll Bludger profile for Playford: 2018

Electoral districts of South Australia
1993 establishments in Australia